Central West River   is a community in the Canadian province of Nova Scotia, located in  Pictou County .

References

Central West River - Geographical Names Board of Canada

Communities in Pictou County